Vuurduin is a lighthouse on the Dutch island Vlieland. The tower is the top part of the former front light of the leading lights in IJmuiden, designed by Quirinus Harder.

The lighthouse was placed on Vlieland in 1909, on top of one of the Vuurboetsduin, one of the highest sand dunes (at 45 metres) in the Netherlands. A lookout tower was built next to the lighthouse in 1929. In 1986, the cupola was renovated. While a lighthouse keeper still attends, the lighthouse is fully automated.

See also

List of lighthouses in the Netherlands

References

Gallery

External links

Lighthouses completed in 1909
Lighthouses in Friesland
Rijksmonuments in Friesland
Vlieland